Jan Janz Slop, or Jan Slob (1643 in Edam – 1727), was a Dutch Golden Age painter.

According to Houbraken he was a glasspainter who lived to be the last of a breed. He had been a pupil of Jozef Oostfries and was still active at 75 when Houbraken was writing in 1712.

He married Heiltje Sieuwerts 31 December 1661 in Hoorn with attestatie from Edam. Heiltje was the sister of Catharina Oostfries, and when Catharina's husband Claes van der Meulen died, he was named as guardian over their children in Catharina's will.

References

1643 births
1727 deaths
Dutch Golden Age painters
Dutch male painters
People from Edam-Volendam